The Dressmaker may refer to:

The Dressmaker (Bainbridge novel), a 1973 gothic psychological novel written by Beryl Bainbridge
The Dressmaker (1988 film), a 1988 British film based on the Bainbridge novel, directed by Jim O'Brien
The Dressmaker (Ham novel), a gothic novel written by the Australian author Rosalie Ham
The Dressmaker (2015 film), a 2015 Australian film based on the Ham novel, directed by Jocelyn Moorhouse